Cumberland is an incorporated village municipality east of Perseverance Creek, near the east coast of central Vancouver Island, British Columbia.

Prospecting & preliminary activity
Although First Nations had long known the existence of coal in the area, J.W. Mackay discovered coal near today's town site while exploring in 1852. Armed with such knowledge, Sam Cliffe formed a syndicate, which in 1869 staked claims on Perseverance (formerly Coal) Creek that flows northwest into Comox Lake. The group hacked a trail to today's Royston. Their Union Coal Mining Co., named to honour the 1871 union of British Columbia with Canada, graded sections for a rail bed along this route. A sawpit was established about half way, with some wooden rails cut and laid for a horse-drawn tramway. Unable to raise further capital when funds were exhausted, development work ceased.

In 1887, Robert Dunsmuir bought the enterprise and incorporated the Union Colliery Co. He arranged for a sawmill to be brought to the mine area. After unloading at today's Royston, oxen hauled the machinery. Only  of the earlier rail bed remained passable. For the  gap, Grant and Mounce built a wagon road while advancing, taking two to three months to reach the mine.

Railways
See Railway to Union Bay.

Coalmining

Coal production was 31,204 tons in 1889, and 66,556 tons in 1892. By 1897, the mine was yielding 700 to 1,000 tons per day, and employed 600 men.

In 1910, Sir William Mackenzie purchased all the Dunsmuir mines through his Canadian Collieries (Dunsmuir).
In 1912, the colliery established a hydroelectric plant on the Puntledge River, which supplied the whole Comox Valley.

Total miners killed in a single coal dust explosion at Cumberland were 64 in 1901, 21 in 1903, 18 in 1922, and 33 in 1923.

In 1912, management locked out protesting Cumberland miners who took an idle day. Industrial action spread, and all unionized Vancouver Island miners were on strike by summer 1913. Strikebreakers were protected by special police, until riots broke out at Cumberland, which prompted the BC government to send in troops.

The miners were based at Cumberland. On closure in 1960, an employee-owned smaller operation ran until final closure in 1966.

Early settlement

The company village was originally named Union after the Union Coal Company. In 1894, adjacent to the neighbourhood, a new townsite of Cumberland was laid out with lots for sale. Exports from the Cumberland Coalfield in Great Britain were known for a high quality also found at the Union mine. Consequently, the principal avenues of Maryport, Windermere, Penrith, Derwent, Allen and Keswick, were named after places in Cumberland County. In 1898, the Cumberland name was adopted for incorporation as a city, and to replace Union for the post office.

In 1895, the hospital began in James Dunsmuir's former residence. Later additions were nine rooms in 1901, a 10-bed ward in 1904, and Jubilee Wing in 1924. Ultimately 41 beds and 6 bassinets existed. In 1977, the hospital closed.

In 1897, the Cumberland-Union Water-Works Company commenced piping water from Hamilton Creek. In 1949, the then City of Cumberland purchased the system.

The 1933 fire destroyed 18 businesses and 11 houses. The hotels affected were the Cumberland, the King George and the Victory. The Cumberland, opened in 1894, was immediately rebuilt, and operated until November 2020. The King George, built in 1911, also rebuilt, closed in 2014. Escaped and built a few years earlier, the Waverley Hotel still operates.

Opened as an opera house in 1914, the historic Ilo-Ilo Theatre began showing silent movies, and held dances. Rebuilt after a 1932 fire, the theatre closed in 1957. Discussions are ongoing to restore the building.

Later settlement
In 1958, the community reincorporated as the Village of Cumberland. In 1969, the Royal Canadian Mounted Police (RCMP) detachment closed, and the three officers moved to Courtenay. Over recent decades, Cumberland has become a significant destination for outdoor recreation, culture and tourism. The location is a bedroom community for Courtenay. The village prepared the Economic Development Strategy 2018–2023 to address challenges.

Demographics 

Ethnicity

Religion 
According to the 2021 census, religious groups in Cumberland included:
Irreligion (3,555 persons or 81.2%)
Christianity (725 persons or 16.6%)
Judaism (25 persons or 0.6%)
Other (70 persons or 1.6%)

Coal Creek Historic Park

Residents drained the wetlands, planted market gardens, and created one of Canada's largest Chinese communities by the end of World War I. Many of the unemployed left during the Great Depression. A 1935 fire destroyed half the buildings. After World War II many buildings were dismantled and the materials salvaged.

In 1963, a lack of funds derailed plans to restore the buildings as an historical tourist attraction. During that decade, collectors ransacked what remained of the site. The rod and gun club leased the area until 2001.

The women operated a traditional tea garden at Comox Lake 1914–1939. The residents permanently abandoned the site in 1942 on their relocation to internment camps for Japanese Canadians during World War II.

Weldwood (now called West Fraser Timber), which had purchased large tracts of land from the colliery, gifted the  site encompassing the Chinese and Japanese settlements to the Village of Cumberland in 2002. Provisionally called Perseverance Creek Historic Park, the present name was adopted in 2008.

Notable people

 Bob Auchterlonie (1969– ), naval officer
 Thomas Audley Bate (1913–1967), politician
 Albert Goodwin (1887–1918), labour activist
 Robert Grant (1854–1935), politician
 Terry Tobacco (1936– ), athlete
 Wong Foon Sien (1899–1971), labour activist

Notes

References

External links

Villages in British Columbia
Populated places in the Comox Valley Regional District